Formicarius is a genus of passerine birds in the family Formicariidae. These birds are all found in the tropical New World, from southern Mexico south to  Central America and northern South America. All are named as antthrushes, and are insectivorous forest birds. They are largely terrestrial, feeding mainly on the ground on ants and other insects.

Taxonomy
The genus Formicarius was introduced by the Dutch naturalist Pieter Boddaert in 1783 in his catalogue of the ten volumes of hand-coloured plates that had been engraved by François-Nicolas Martinet. The plates were produced to accompany Georges-Louis Leclerc, Comte de Buffon's Histoire Naturelle des Oiseaux. The type species was subsequently designated as the rufous-capped antthrush (Formicarius colma) by the English zoologist George Robert Gray in 1840. The generic name Formicarius is Latin meaning "of the ant".

The genus contains six species:

References

ITIS

 
Bird genera
Taxa named by Pieter Boddaert